Ljiljana Mihajlović (born 5 September 1965) is a Serbian politician. She served in the National Assembly of Serbia from 2016 to 2020 as a member of the far-right Serbian Radical Party (Srpska radikalna stranka, SRS).

Early life and private career
Mihajlović was born in Zagreb, in what was then the Socialist Republic of Croatia in the Socialist Federal Republic of Yugoslavia. An economist, she left Croatia at the start of the Yugoslav Wars in 1991 and moved to Belgrade. She lives in Zemun, one of the city's constituent municipalities, and is married to Ognjen Mihajlović, who is also a prominent figure in the Radical Party.

Mihajlović joined the Radical Party in 1993. She was chief of staff for party leader Vojislav Šešelj from 1996 until 2002, when Šešelj went to The Hague to face war crimes charges at the International Criminal Tribunal for the Former Yugoslavia (ICTY). After his departure, she acted in the same capacity for deputy leader Tomislav Nikolić.

In 1997, Mihajlović was awarded the lease on a Zemun apartment that had previously belonged to an ethnic Croatian family. The family had resided in the apartment since 1966 and only discovered they had lost their lease after returning from a vacation. This occurred during Vojislav Šešelj's tenure as mayor of Zemun, and Šešelj presented it to the public as a "victory over the Ustaše." Many understood it as a provocation, intended to stoke existing inter-communal tensions. Mihajlović's lease agreement has been the subject of a protracted legal battle.

Politician

Early years (2000–12)
Mihajlović ran for the Zemun municipal assembly in the municipality's fourth division in the 2000 Serbian local elections and was not elected.

The 2000 local elections took place concurrently with the 2000 Yugoslavian presidential election, a watershed moment in which longtime Serbian leader Slobodan Milošević was defeated by Vojislav Koštunica. The Serbian government fell after Milošević's defeat and a new Serbian parliamentary election was called for December 2000. Mihajlovič received the 189th position on the Radical Party's electoral list; the list won twenty-three seats, and she was not chosen for a mandate. (From 2000 to 2011, Serbian parliamentary mandates were awarded to sponsoring parties or coalitions rather than to individual candidates, and it was common practice for the mandates to be assigned out of numerical order. Mihajlović could have been included in her party's delegation despite her low position on the list, although in the event she was not.)

She later appeared in the twenty-fifth position on the Radical Party's list for the City Assembly of Belgrade in the 2004 Serbian local elections. The list won twenty-seven seats, and, while she was not automatically elected under the rules in place at the time, she was nonetheless given a mandate. The Democratic Party (Demokratska stranka, DS) and its allies won the election, and Mihajlović served in opposition.

She was given the twenty-eighth position on the Radical Party's list in the 2008 parliamentary election and the fifth position on the party's list for Belgrade in the concurrent 2008 local elections. On this occasion, she did not receive a mandate at either level.

The Radical Party experienced a serious split later in 2008, with several prominent members joining the breakaway Serbian Progressive Party (Srpska napredna stranka, SNS) under the leadership of Nikolić and Aleksandar Vučić. Mihajlović remained with the Radicals.

Since 2012
Serbia's electoral system was reformed in 2011, such that all parliamentary mandates were awarded in numerical order to candidates on successful lists. Mihajlović received the ninth position on the Radical Party's list in the 2012 parliamentary election and was promoted to the third position in 2014. The party did not cross the electoral threshold on either occasion. She was again given the third position on the party's list for the 2016 parliamentary election and was this time elected when the party won twenty-two mandates. The SNS and its allies won a majority victory, and Mihajlović served in opposition for the next four years. She was a member of the assembly committee on the Serbian diaspora and Serbs in the region, a deputy member of the committee on human and minority rights and gender equality, and a member of the parliamentary friendship groups with Armenia, Belarus, China, and Venezuela.

She again appeared in the third position on the Radical Party's list in the 2020 parliamentary election and was promoted to the second position in the 2022 parliamentary election. On both occasions, the party once again failed to cross the electoral threshold.

In May 2022, Vojislav Šešelj received a summons to appear before the International Residual Mechanism for Criminal Tribunals (the successor body to the ICTY) to respond to charges concerning the publication of classified information and the names of protected witnesses. The summons also included the names of seven current and former Radical Party officials, including Mihajlović.

Electoral record

Local (Municipality of Zemun)

References

1965 births
Living people
People from Zemun
Politicians from Zagreb
Politicians from Belgrade
21st-century Serbian women politicians
21st-century Serbian politicians
Members of the National Assembly (Serbia)
Members of the City Assembly of Belgrade
Serbian Radical Party politicians
Serbs of Croatia
Women members of the National Assembly (Serbia)